Sandro Šanta Tomaš (born October 9, 1972 in Zagreb) is a former philosopher medley swimmer from Croatia, who competed for his native country at the 2000 Summer Olympics in Sydney, Australia. There he ended up in 42nd place in the men's 400 m individual medley event.

Sandro was a former 400  individual medley (short course) Croatian national record holder (4:17:51).

He has seen much success in the masters swim meets, most notably a World champion in Perth, Australia in 2008 and European record holder in 100 m butterfly. 

Since 2002, he has been serving as a swim coach at HAPK Mladost  swim club for which he competed his whole career.

References
 sports-reference
 Profile

1972 births
Living people
Croatian male swimmers
Male medley swimmers
Olympic swimmers of Croatia
Swimmers at the 2000 Summer Olympics
Swimmers from Zagreb